Winslow is an English surname. Notable people with the surname include:

 Anna Green Winslow (1759–1780), colonial American diarist, daughter of Joshua Winslow
 Bradley Winslow (1831–1914), American Civil War Union brevet brigadier general 
 Brett Winslow (born 1967), American volleyball player
 Cameron Winslow (1854–1932), US Navy admiral
 Carleton Winslow (1876–1946), American architect
 Celeste M. A. Winslow (1837–1908), American author
 Charles Winslow (1888–1963), South African tennis player
 Charles-Edward Amory Winslow (1877–1957), American bacteriologist and public health expert
 Charles F. Winslow (1811–1877), American physician, botanist and diplomat
 Daniel Winslow (born 1958), American lawyer and politician
 Don Winslow (born 1953), American author
 Donald James Winslow (1911–2010), American English professor
 Edward Winslow (1595–1655), English-American pilgrim leader on the Mayflower and governor of Plymouth Colony
 Edward Winslow (loyalist) (1746/47-1815), American loyalist officer, judge and official
 Edward Winslow (silversmith) (1669-1753), early American silversmith
 Edward Francis Winslow (1837–1914), American Civil War Union brevet brigadier general and railroad executive
 Forbes Benignus Winslow (1810–1874), psychiatrist
 Francis A. Winslow (1866–1932), American judge
 George Winslow (born 1946), American child actor
 George Winslow (American football) (born 1963), American National Football League former punter
 Harriet Winslow (1796–1833), American missionary
 Helen M. Winslow (1851–1938), American author, journalist
 Herbert Winslow (1848–1914), US Navy rear admiral
 Jacob B. Winslow (1669–1760), Danish-born French anatomist
 Jack Copley Winslow (1882–1974), English missionary
 James Winslow  (born 1983), British racing driver
 John Winslow (disambiguation), several people
 Joshua Winslow (1726–1801), Canadian soldier, judge and politician
 Josiah Winslow (c.1628-1680), colonial American Governor of Plymouth Colony
 Justise Winslow (born 1996), American basketball player 
 Kellen Winslow (born 1957), American football player 
 Kellen Winslow II (born 1983), American football player and son of Kellen Winslow
 L. Forbes Winslow (1844–1913), British psychiatrist
 Margaret E. Winslow (1836–1936), American activist, editor, author
 Michael Winslow (born 1958), American actor and comedian known as the "Man of 10,000 Sound Effects"
 Norris Winslow (1834–1900), New York banker and politician
 Ola Elizabeth Winslow (1885–1977), American author and historian
 Pat Winslow (born 1943), American retired heptathlete and track and field coach
 Paul Winslow (American football) (born 1938), former defensive back in the National Football League
 Paul Winslow (cricketer) (1929–2011), South African cricketer
 Perry Winslow (1815–1890), American whaling ship master
 Rickie Winslow (born 1964), American basketball player 
 Robert Winslow (1916–1994), American football player and coach
 Robert E. Winslow (general) (1829–1893), American Civil War Union brevet brigadier general
 Rosemary Winslow, American poet, and academic
 Ryan Winslow (born 1994), American football player
 Samuel Winslow (1862–1940), American politician
 Thomasina Winslow (1965-2023), American musician
 Tom Winslow (1940–2010), American folk singer and songwriter
 Walter C. Winslow (1882–1962), American judge
 Warren Winslow (1810–1862), Governor of North Carolina

Fictional characters
 Cassie Layne Winslow and Richard Winslow, on the American soap opera Guiding Light
 The Winslow family, in the American television sitcom Family Matters
 Ephraim Winslow, character in The Lighthouse (2019 film)

English toponymic surnames